Augusta Holmes Clawson (June 23, 1903 – May 13, 1997) was an American civil servant, and writer of Shipyard Diary of a Woman Welder, a diary about welding in World War II.

Clawson was a graduate of Vassar. In 1943, she was assigned by the United States Office of Education to work undercover as a welder at the Swan Island Shipyard in order to discover the difficulties faced by women workers and the reasons many women welders were leaving the job shortly after completing training. Her book based on her experiences there, Shipyard Diary of a Woman Welder, was published in 1944 by Penguin Books. She retired from government service in 1973.

Clawson gave a collection of items from her time as a welder, including her welding helmet, to the Smithsonian Institution.

References

1903 births
1997 deaths
20th-century American women writers
Vassar College alumni
Welders
American women civilians in World War II
20th-century United States government officials